The Dolphins is a 2014 Indian Malayalam-language comedy-drama film directed by Diphan, written by Anoop Menon and produced by M C Arun. It stars Suresh Gopi, Anoop Menon and Meghana Raj in the lead roles.

Plot
Panayamuttam Sura is a bar owner, who wishes to be respected and recognised beyond his liquor baron image in the society. An astrologer predicts that he will have a good future, if a woman enters his life as a 'luck amplifier.' Though he loves his wife, Sura starts conversing with a new woman. Meanwhile, a murder takes place, which has a bearing on his past.

Cast

Soundtrack

The songs are composed by M. Jayachandran. The soundtrack album, which was released on 2014, features one song overall, with lyrics penned by Sathyan Anthikkadu.

References

External links
https://www.imdb.com/title/tt8540196/reference

2014 films
2010s Malayalam-language films
Films about organised crime in India
Films about alcoholism
Films directed by Diphan